True Law (original title: Prawo Agaty) is a Polish legal drama television series directed by Maciej Migas and featuring Agnieszka Dygant as the title character, Agata Przybysz. It premiered on TVN on 4 March 2012. The plot is set in Warsaw.

Plot
The series tells the story of Agata Przybysz (Agnieszka Dygant), coming from Bydgoszcz an over-thirty director of law section in a big insurance company, who loses her job as effect of some unpleasant events. Now she has to build her career life and private life from the beginning. Her friend, Dorota (Daria Widawska), offers her to launch a set of chambers together. For Agata, it is the brand new experience. The cases, people and their problems, that she faces in her new job, differ from the insurance cases she was used to.

Cast
 Agnieszka Dygant as Agata Przybysz
 Daria Widawska as Dorota, Agata's friend
 Tomasz Karolak as Wojciech, Dorota's husband
 Leszek Lichota as Dębski
 Małgorzata Kożuchowska as prosecutor Maria Okońska
 Marian Opania as Agata's father
 Michał Mikołajczak as Bartek Janowski, Agata's assistant

Ratings
True Law premiered on TVN on 4 March 2012 at 8:00 p.m. with two back-to-back episodes which attracted the audience of 3.57 million viewers with the share of 20.84%. In group "16-49" True Law reached share of 23.04% and was watched by 1.84 million viewers. It was the 14th most watched program of the weekend.

International broadcast
Following the success in Poland, broadcast rights have been sold abroad. In Russia, the series airs under the local title Правосудие Агаты on Много ТВ. In Montenegro, two complete series have been broadcast on TV Vijesti after premiere on 9 June 2014 under title Agatino pravo.

See also
List of True Law episodes

References

External links

Official site

True Law at Distribution.tvn.pl (English)

Polish television series
2012 Polish television series debuts
2015 Polish television series endings
2010s Polish television series
TVN (Polish TV channel) original programming